The confusing poison frog (Ameerega maculata) is a species of frog in the family Dendrobatidae endemic to Panama. It is only known from its type locality, "Chiriqui" (which at the time of the description included both Atlantic and Pacific versants of western Panama).

Its natural habitat is unknown but might be forest. It is threatened by habitat loss; it might already been extinct given the level of deforestation within the region of collection.

References

maculata
Amphibians of Panama
Endemic fauna of Panama
Amphibians described in 1873
Taxa named by Wilhelm Peters
Taxonomy articles created by Polbot
Taxobox binomials not recognized by IUCN